Daniel Divaker Chetti is Professor at the Arab Baptist Theological Seminary. Daniel Chetti was known for his contribution as Director of Programmes and Church Relations at the Board of Theological Education of the Senate of Serampore College in Bangalore as well as at the Gurukul Lutheran Theological College, Chennai. He was educated at La Martiniere, Calcutta, where he was a House Captain.

Chetti's doctoral work on Khonds has been kept for posterity at the National Library, Kolkata.

Writings
 1986, A history of the Meriah Wars, 1836-1862 : policies and personalities in the evolution of British moral imperative among the Khonds of Orissa,
 1989 (Edited with Aravind P. Nirmal), Adventurous faith & transforming vision,
 1989, Making Visible: The Role of Women in the Nineteenth Century Protestant Christianity in India
 1996, Ecology and Development: Theological Perspectives,
 1998 (Edited with M. P. Joseph), Ethical issues in the struggles for justice : quest for pluriform communities : essays in honour of K.C. Abraham,

References

Telugu people
20th-century Christian clergy
Indian Christian theologians
Academic staff of the Senate of Serampore College (University)
Indian Baptists
Year of birth missing (living people)
Living people
Convention of Baptist Churches of Northern Circars
Canadian Baptist Ministries